Paint is the second studio album by indie rock band, Holy Holy. The album was released in February 2017 and debuted and peaked at number 7 on the ARIA Charts.

Reception

Josh Leeson from Newcastle Herald said "Much like its cover art's abstract collage of colours, Paint is an album of dense experimentation.". Lesson said "singles 'Darwinism' and 'Elevator' are the most commercial" and concluded saying "There are deep layers to Paint to reward multiple listens."

Simon Winkler from Stack Magazine said "Paint feels especially appropriate as the title for Holy Holy's second album. It's an artful collection of songs that draw from the everyday to create compelling portraits and landscapes. Quiet reveries of quotidian bliss, the silent struggles and victories of our internal lives, and the contradictions of our fragmentary identities are all captured in vivid tones." Winkler said "Holy Holy are skilled lyricists and musicians, exploring universal questions of how we relate to ourselves and others; their blues, rock, and electronic-imbued tracks are layered with poetic detail, revealing more with each listen.".

Music Journalist Bernard Zuel said "Crank this up and there'll be times when you're chucking rock god poses in front of a mirror and if you have yourself aviator sunnies I'd recommend digging them out the next time you play Holy Holy in the car, which you will pretend is a convertible."

Track listing

Charts

Release history

References

2017 albums
Holy Holy (Australian band) albums
Sony Music Australia albums